is a special ward located in Tokyo Metropolis, Japan. In English, it is often called Ōta City.

, the ward has an estimated population of 716,413, with 379,199 households and a population density of 12,048.65 persons per km2. The total area is 59.46 km2, the largest of the special wards.

Districts and neighborhoods

Former Ōmori Ward
 Chidori
 Chūō
 Den'enchōfu
 Den'enchōfuhon-chō
 Den'enchōfuminami
 Higashimagome
 Higashimine-chō
 Higashiyukigaya
 Ikegami
 Ishikawamachi
 Kamiikedai
 Kitamagome
 Kitamine-chō
 Kitasenzoku
 Kugahara
 Minamikugahara
 Minamimagome
 Minamisenzoku
 Minamiyukigaya
 Nakaikegami
 Nakamagome
 Nishimagome
 Nishimine-chō
 Ōmorihigashi
 Ōmorihonchō
 Ōmorikita
 Ōmoriminami
 Ōmorinaka
 Ōmorinishi
 San'nō
 Unoki
 Yukigayaōtsuka-chō

Former Kamata Ward
 Haginaka
 Haneda
 Hanedaasahi-chō
 Higashikamata
 Higashikōjiya
 Higashirokugō
 Higashiyaguchi
 Honhaneda
 Kamata
 Kamatahonchō
 Kitakōjiya
 Minamikamata
 Minamirokugō
 Nakarokugō
 Nishikamata
 Nishikōjiya
 Nishirokugō
 Shimomaruko
 Shinkamata
 Tamagawa
 Yaguchia

History
The ward was founded on March 15, 1947, merging the old wards of Ōmori and Kamata.

Haneda Airport, now the main domestic airport for the Greater Tokyo Area, was first established as Haneda Airfield in 1931 in the town of Haneda, Ebara District of Tokyo Prefecture. In 1945, it became Haneda Army Air Base under the control of the United States Army. In the same year, the Occupation ordered the expansion of the airport, evicting people from the surroundings on 48 hours' notice. With the end of the occupation, the Americans returned part of the facility to Japanese control in 1952, completing the return in 1958. Haneda Airport in Ōta was the major international airport for Tokyo, and handled traffic for the 1964 Tokyo Olympics.

Politics and government

The city is run by a city assembly of 50 elected members. The current mayor is Tadayoshi Matsubara.
 2007 Ōta local election

Geography
The southernmost of the 23 special wards, Ōta borders the special wards of Shinagawa, Meguro and Setagaya to the north, and Kōtō to the east. Across the Tama River in Kanagawa Prefecture is the city of Kawasaki, forming the boundaries to the south and west.

Landmarks
 Ikegami Honmon-ji, a Buddhist temple of the Nichiren Shū.
 Ōmori Shell Mound site
 Senzoku Pond, where Nichiren is said to have washed his feet. The grave of Katsu Kaishū is nearby.
 Tamagawadai Park
 Tokyo Wild Bird Park

Transportation

Air
Haneda Airport

Rail 
JR East Keihin-Tōhoku Line: Ōmori, Kamata Stations
Keikyū
Main Line: Heiwajima, Ōmorimachi, Ume Yashiki, Keikyū-Kamata, Zoshiki, Rokugo-dote Stations
Airport Line: Keikyū-Kamata, Kojiya, Otorii, Anamori Inari, Tenkubashi, Haneda Airport Stations
Tokyu Corporation
Tōkyū Tōyoko Line: Den-en-chōfu, Tamagawa Stations
Tōkyū Ikegami Line: ten stations
Tōkyū Tamagawa Line: Tamagawa, Numabe, Unoki, Shimo-Maruko, Musashi-Nitta, Yaguchi no Watashi, Kamata Stations (entire line)
Tōkyū Ōimachi Line: Kita-Senzoku Station, Ookayama Station
Tokyo Monorail: Ryutsu Center, Showajima, Seibijo, Tenkubashi, Shin Seibijo, Haneda Airport Stations
Toei Asakusa Line: Magome, Nishi-Magome Stations

Highways
Shuto Expressway
No. 1 Haneda Route (Edobashi JCT - Iriya)
B Bayshore Route (Namiki - Kawasaki-ukishima JCT)
National highways
Route 1
Route 15
Route 133
Route 357

Economy

The following companies have their headquarters in Ōta.
 ANA Wings (subsidiary of All Nippon Airways, has its corporate head office on property of Haneda Airport)
 Alps Electric
 Canon
 Disco Corporation, manufacturer of semiconductor production equipment
 Ebara
 Ikegami Tsushinki, manufacturer of broadcast equipment
 Skymark Airlines, at Tokyo International Airport
 Takasago International Corporation, a flavours and fragrances company
 Toyoko Inn, in the Kamata district of Ōta

Former operations
Namco, best known for video game franchises such as Pac-Man, Galaxian, and Ace Combat, were headquartered in Ota. The company moved its operations there in 1985, using the funds generated from the successful Family Computer port of Xevious to fund the construction of its office. The building was taken over by Namco Bandai Games after it absorbed Namco in 2006, and later by an unrelated Namco company that focused on video arcades and theme parks. The newer Namco company moved out of the building in 2014 and it was demolished two years later.

Prior to the merger with Japan Airlines, Japan Air System had its headquarters by Tokyo International Airport in Ōta.

In 2000 All Nippon Airways was headquartered by Tokyo International Airport in Ōta. The ANA subsidiary Air Nippon Network was also based at the airport.

Before its dissolution, Galaxy Airlines was headquartered in the ARC Building on the airport grounds.

Sega and its parent company Sega Sammy Holdings, best known for its Sonic the Hedgehog franchise, was originally headquartered in Ota. However, Sega Sammy Holdings announced in April 2017 that it would relocate its head office functions and domestic subsidiaries to Shinagawa-ku by January 2018. This was to consolidate scattered head office functions including Sega Sammy Holdings, Sammy Corporation, Sega Holdings, Sega Games, Atlus, Sammy Network, and Dartslive. After the relocation to Shinagawa-ku was complete, Sega's previous headquarters in Ōta was later sold in February 2019 and will likely be torn down.

Gakken was headquartered in Ota from 1962 until 2008 when they moved their headquarters to Shinagawa-ku.

Education

Colleges and universities
Toho University Ōmori Campus
Tokyo Institute of Technology Ōokayama Campus: straddles the boundary with Meguro
Showa University Senzoku Campus
Tokyo University of Technology Kamata Campus

High schools
The following public high schools are located in Ōta, operated by the Tokyo Metropolitan Government Board of Education.
Den Enchofu High School
Kamata High School

Omori High School

Private high schools include Tokyo High School and Tokyo Jitsugyo High School.

Elementary and junior high schools

Municipal junior high schools:
 Den en Chofu Junior High School (田園調布中学校)
 Haneda Junior High School (羽田中学校)
 Hasunuma Junior High School (蓮沼中学校)
 Higashi Chofu Junior High School (東調布中学校)
 Ishikawadai Junior High School (石川台中学校)
 Izumo Junior High School (出雲中学校)
 Kaizuka Junior High School (貝塚中学校)
 Kamata Junior High School (蒲田中学校)
 Kojiya Junior High School (糀谷中学校)
 Magome Junior High School (馬込中学校)
 Magome Higashi Junior High School (馬込東中学校)
 Minami Rokugo Junior High School (南六郷中学校)
 Misono Junior High School (御園中学校)
 Omori No. 1 Junior High School (大森第一中学校)
 Omori No. 2 Junior High School (大森第二中学校)
 Omori No. 3 Junior High School (大森第三中学校)
 Omori No. 4 Junior High School (大森第四中学校)
 Omori No. 6 Junior High School (大森第六中学校)
 Omori No. 7 Junior High School (大森第七中学校)
 Omori No. 8 Junior High School (大森第八中学校)
 Omori No. 10 Junior High School (大森第十中学校)
 Omori Higashi Junior High School (大森東中学校)
 Rokugo Junior High School (六郷中学校)
 Shimoda Junior High School (志茂田中学校)
 Toho Junior High School (東蒲中学校)
 Yaguchi Junior High School (矢口中学校)
 Yasukata Junior High School (安方中学校)
 Yukigaya Junior High School (雪谷中学校)

Municipal elementary schools:
 Aioi Elementary School (相生小学校)
 Akamatsu Elementary School (赤松小学校)
 Chidori Elementary School (千鳥小学校)
 Chisetsu Elementary School (池雪小学校)
 Chofu Otsuka Elementary School (調布大塚小学校)
 Den en Chofu Elementary School (田園調布小学校)
 Haginaka Elementary School (萩中小学校)
 Haneda Elementary School (羽田小学校)
 Higashi Chofu No. 1 Elementary School (東調布第一小学校)
 Higashi Chofu No. 3 Elementary School (東調布第三小学校)
 Higashi Kojiya Elementary School (東糀谷小学校)
 Higashi Rokugo Elementary School (東六郷小学校)
 Ikegami Elementary School (池上小学校)
 Ikegami No. 2 Elementary School (池上第二小学校)
 Iriarai No. 1 Elementary School (入新井第一小学校)
 Iriarai No. 2 Elementary School (入新井第二小学校)
 Iriarai No. 4 Elementary School (入新井第四小学校)
 Iriarai No. 5 Elementary School (入新井第五小学校)
 Izumo Elementary School (出雲小学校)
 Kaio Elementary School (開桜小学校)
 Kamata Elementary School (蒲田小学校)
 Kita Kojiya Elementary School (北糀谷小学校)
 Koike Elementary School (小池小学校)
 Kojiya Elementary School (糀谷小学校)
 Kugahara Elementary School (久原小学校)
 Magome Elementary School (馬込小学校)
 Magome No. 2 Elementary School (馬込第二小学校)
 Magome No. 3 Elementary School (馬込第三小学校)
 Michizuka Elementary School (道塚小学校)
 Minami Rokugo Elementary School (南六郷小学校)
 Minemachi Elementary School (嶺町小学校)
 Nakahaginaka Elementary School (中萩中小学校)
 Nakarokugo Elementary School (仲六郷小学校)
 Nakatomi Elementary School (中富小学校)
 Nanpo Elementary School (南蒲小学校)
 Nishi Rokugo Elementary School (西六郷小学校)
 Omori No. 1 Elementary School (大森第一小学校)
 Omori No. 3 Elementary School (大森第三小学校)
 Omori No. 4 Elementary School (大森第四小学校)
 Omori No. 5 Elementary School (大森第五小学校)
 Omori Higashi Elementary School (大森東小学校)
 Onazuka Elementary School (おなづか小学校)
 Rokugo Elementary School (六郷小学校)
 Sanno Elementary School (山王小学校)
 Senzokuike Elementary School (洗足池小学校)
 Shimizukubo Elementary School (清水窪小学校)
 Shimoda Elementary School (志茂田小学校)
 Shinshuku Elementary School (新宿小学校)
 Shosen Elementary School (松仙小学校)
 Takahata Elementary School (高畑小学校)
 Tamagawa Elementary School (多摩川小学校)
 Toho Elementary School (東蒲小学校)
 Tokumochi Elementary School (徳持小学校)
 Tonan Elementary School (都南小学校)
 Umeda Elementary School (梅田小学校)
 Yaguchi Elementary School (矢口小学校)
 Yaguchi Higashi Elementary School (矢口東小学校)
 Yaguchi Nishi Elementary School (矢口西小学校)
 Yukigaya Elementary School (雪谷小学校)

International schools
  - North Korean school

Previously the Deutsche Schule Tokyo was in the ward. The school is now in Yokohama.

Libraries
The city operates several libraries, including:

Ota Library (the main library)
Hamatake Library
Haneda Library
Ikegami Library
Kamata Library
Kamata Ekimae Library
Kugahara Library
Magome Library
Omori East Library
Omori South Library
Omori West Library
Rokugo Library
Senzokuike Library
Shimomaruko Library
Tamagawa Library

Sister cities
Ōta has a sister city relationship with Salem, Massachusetts. The discovery of a shell mound in Ōmori, one of the forerunners of Ōta, by Edward S. Morse, director of the museum in Salem, occasioned the tie. Ōta has a friendship link with Chaoyang District, Beijing, China.
Ōta has a sister city relationship with Lafayette, Indiana and Burbank, California.

See also

References

External links

Ōta City Official Website 
Ōta City Tourism Website 

 
1947 establishments in Japan
Populated places established in 1947
Wards of Tokyo